is a fictional character and the main protagonist of Square's (now Square Enix's) 1997 role-playing video game Final Fantasy VII, its high-definition remake, and several of its sequels and spinoffs. In Final Fantasy VII, Cloud is a mercenary claiming to be formerly of SOLDIER, a group of elite supersoldiers employed by the Shinra Electric Power Company, a megacorporation responsible for draining the life from the planet. Relying solely on his large broadsword, Cloud joins the resistance group AVALANCHE in the fight against Shinra, and driven by a feud with his former superior, the primary antagonist Sephiroth who attempts to conquer the world, Cloud learns to accept his troubled past and adapts to his role as a leader.

Cloud reappears as the protagonist in the 2005 computer-animated sequel film, Final Fantasy VII: Advent Children, in which he fights a new threat composed of a trio attacking his allies while also dealing with his own terminal illness, "Geostigma". He acts in a supporting role in other Compilation of Final Fantasy VII titles, and is featured in several other games in the wider Final Fantasy series. Various titles outside the franchise such as the Kingdom Hearts series by Square Enix and Disney, and the Super Smash Bros. series by Nintendo show the character.

Cloud was designed by Tetsuya Nomura, a character artist for the Final Fantasy series, whose role expanded during the title's development to include supervision over Cloud's personality. Yoshinori Kitase, director of VII, and Kazushige Nojima, one of the game's events planners, developed the story and wanted to create a mysterious character who acted atypically for a hero. After VII, Nomura redesigned Cloud for Advent Children, giving him realistic appearance alongside new weapory and mutfit. For Remake, the team tried making his classic design realistic.

Cloud has garnered a primarily positive reception from critics. Described as iconic, Cloud has been cited favorably as an example of complex character writing in video games, as one of its first unreliable narrators, and for the game's depiction of his mental disorder. Additionally, he is seen as a messiah figure in both the game and film for standing against Sephiroth's schemes and supported by his allies. He has ranked highly in various character lists compiled by video game publications, and remains popular among fans, continuing to place highly in popularity polls conducted by Famitsu, Guinness, and other organizations. His characterization and design have also served as a trope for other characters, most notably Lightning from Final Fantasy XIII. He has also become the basis for a variety of merchandise, such as action figures and jewelry. Cloud has been voiced by multiple actors, with Steve Burton and Cody Christian's English vocal performances being the subject of praise.

Concept

In contrast to Final Fantasy VI, which featured multiple "main characters", Square's staff decided at the outset of Final Fantasy VII development that the game would follow a single identifiable protagonist. In Hironobu Sakaguchi's first plot treatment, a prototype for Cloud's character belonged to an organization attempting to destroy New York City's "Mako Reactors". After a pause in development so that the team could help finish Chrono Trigger, Square began experimenting with next-generation hardware. A small group including Kitase and Nomura worked in secret to develop a demo for a Nintendo 64 emulation kit running on an SGI Onyx. Kitase and Nomura discussed that Cloud would be the lead of three protagonists, but Nomura did not receive character profiles or a completed scenario in advance. Left to imagine the stories behind the characters he designed, Nomura shared these details in discussions with staff or in separately penned notes. Frustrated by the continued popularity of Final Fantasy IV characters despite the release of two sequels, Nomura made it his goal to create a memorable cast. The contrast between Cloud, a "young, passionate boy", and Sephiroth, a "more mature and cool" individual, struck Amano as "intriguing", though not unusual as a pairing. When designing Cloud and Sephiroth, Nomura imagined a rivalry mirroring that of Miyamoto Musashi and Sasaki Kojirō, with Cloud and Sephiroth representing Musashi and Kojirō, respectively.

Kitase and Nojima developed Cloud's backstory and his relationship to Sephiroth. While drafting the game's scenario, Nojima saw a standing animation created by event planner Motomu Toriyama that depicted "Cloud showing off". The animation impressed Nojima and inspired the idea that Cloud had developed a false persona. This later led Nojima to create Zack Fair, a SOLDIER whom Cloud aspired to be like, to expand on the mystery of Cloud's past. Nojima left the unfolding of events regarding Cloud's identity unwritten, and Kitase remained unaware of the significance of Zack's addition until playtesting. Kitase reviewed Nojima's scenario and felt that Cloud, being neither single-minded nor righteous, offered a fresh take on a protagonist. The love triangle between Cloud, Tifa Lockhart, and Aerith Gainsborough was also viewed as novel for the series. Nojima likened Cloud and Tifa's relationship to one of friends since nursery school, and compared Aerith to a transfer student arriving mid-term.

In early scripts, Sephiroth would have deceived Cloud into thinking Sephiroth had created him, and Sephiroth could exert control over Cloud's movements. As in the finished game, Cloud would discover the truth that Shinra's experiments and his own insecurities had made him susceptible to Sephiroth's manipulation. Cloud would have also somehow injured Tifa prior to the game's events, leaving her with memory loss of the event and a large scar on her back. Kitase rejected a proposed scene written by Masato Kato involving Cloud and Tifa walking out of a Chocobo stable the morning before the final battle, with Tifa following only after checking around. Kitase found it "too intense" and Nojima described the proposal as "extreme"; however, Kitase maintained a toned-down scene written by Kato depicting the night before, which has Tifa speak a risqué line of dialogue before a fade to black. According to Nojima, none of the staff expected that the scene, despite "the line in question", "would be something so important".

Nojima wanted to write scenes in such a way that players themselves could decide what Cloud was thinking. Nojima used Cloud's foggy memories as a device to provide details about the world that would be unknown to the player but considered common knowledge to its inhabitants. To emphasize Cloud's personality, event planners repeated elements they found interesting such as Toriyama's standing animation and Cloud's use of the phrase "not interested".

In retrospective, Nomura and Final Fantasy VII Remake co-director Naoki Hamaguchi have described Cloud as a "dorky character". According to Nomura, although post-Final Fantasy VII titles featuring Cloud have emphasized his "cool side", "in the original game, Cloud had many comical or lame moments". Nomura believes that the reason Cloud became popular with audiences is due to the impact Cloud's personality made in Nojima's scenario.

Designs

In addition to testing models ported from Square's 1995 SIGGRAPH demo, Nomura and a handful of other artists created new characters, including an early design of Cloud. Sakaguchi, impressed with Nomura's illustrations and detailed handwritten notes for Final Fantasy V and VI, tasked Nomura with designing Final Fantasy VII main characters. 

Cloud's design underwent several revisions. Nomura's first draft of Cloud featured slicked-back black hair to contrast with the long silver hair of the game's primary antagonist, Sephiroth, and to minimize the model's polygon count. However, to make Cloud stand out more and emphasize his role as the game's lead protagonist, Nomura altered Cloud's design to give him spiky, bright blond hair. Nomura also made Cloud taller than he appeared in the SGI Onyx demo, while a discarded iteration drawn "more on the realistic side" depicted Cloud with an even taller head and body and a more muscular physique.

Yoshitaka Amano, who had handled character illustrations for previous Final Fantasy titles, painted promotional images for the game by taking Nomura's "drawings and put[ting his] own spin on them". According to Amano, because of the hardware limitations of the PlayStation, the platform Square had settled on for Final Fantasy VII, characters could not be rendered realistically. Amano thought Cloud's baggy pants, which taper at the bottom, reflected a "very ... Japanese style", resembling the silhouette of a hakama. 

Variations included additions such as a small chain connected to the pommel, magnets that would secure the blade to Cloud's back, and a more detailed design that resembled a "Western-style sword". The Buster Sword's blade grew in subsequent illustrations, and Nomura called it "the Giant Kitchen Knife", envisioning it as unrefined steel. The Hardy-Daytona is based on a real-life motorbike, the Yamaha VMAX.

Further development

Advent Children characterization
For Advent Children, Nomura agreed to direct the project largely because of his attachment to the character of Cloud. Although Nomura stated that Cloud was a more positive character in Final Fantasy VII than in Advent Children, he did not believe that such an "'upbeat' image of him is what stuck in the minds of the fans", and the script was written to explain why Cloud returned to a state of mind "consistent with the fans' view of him". Nomura describes Cloud's life as peaceful but, hurt by the losses he experienced during the original game, one which he grew scared of losing. Blaming himself for things outside of his control, Cloud, Nomura elaborated, needed to overcome himself. In contrast to other heroes, who, in Nomura's view, typically possess character defects amounting only to quirks, Nomura believed Cloud's weakness to be humanizing.

Nojima viewed the theme of the story as one of forgiveness, which he believed required hardship. Cloud, by taking up his sword and fighting, struggles to achieve it. Nojima sought to establish Cloud's withdrawn personality by depicting him with a cell phone, but never answering any calls. He originally intended for Aerith's name to be the last of those displayed while the backlog of ignored messages appears as Cloud's cell phone sinks into the water, but Nojima altered the scene because it "sounded too creepy". The wolf which Cloud imagines "represents the deepest part of Cloud's psyche" and "appears in response to some burden that Cloud is carrying deep in his heart", vanishing at the film's end. Nomura cites one of the film's final scenes, in which Cloud smiles, as his favorite, highlighting the lack of dialogue and Cloud's embarrassment. The scene influenced composer Nobuo Uematsu's score, who grew excited after coming across it in his review of the script, commenting on the difficulty players who had finished Final Fantasy VII would have had imagining Cloud's smile.

Nomura sought to make Cloud's design distinctly different from the other characters. About thirty different designs were made for Cloud's face, and his hair was altered both to give it a more realistic look and to illustrate that two years had passed since the game's conclusion. The staff attempted rendering Cloud based on the game's original illustrations, but concluded that doing so left his eyes unrealistically big, which "looked gross". Further revisions were made to Cloud's face after completion of the pilot film, which featured a more realistic style. In contrast to his hair, Cloud's clothes were difficult to make in the film. Deciding to give Cloud a simple costume consistent with the concept of "clothes designed for action", the staff began with the idea of a black robe, eventually parring it down to a "long apron" shifted to one side.

Cloud's weaponry was based on the joking observation that because his sword in the original game was already enormously tall, in the sequel, he should use sheer numbers. Referred to as  during the film's development, early storyboard concepts included Cloud carrying six swords on his back, although the idea was later modified to six interlocking swords. While the idea wasn't "logically thought out" and the staff didn't think that they could "make it work physically", it was believed to provide "an interesting accent to the story". Cloud's new motorcycle, was designed by Takayuki Takeya, who was asked by the staff to design an upgraded version of Cloud's "Hardy-Daytona" motorcycle from Final Fantasy VII. As development continued, the bike got bigger, with Takeya feeling its heaviness provided an impact that worked well within the film. In the original game, Cloud's strongest technique was the swordplay . The staff laughed at the name given to Cloud's move during the making of it as Nomura was inspired by a sport move from Final Fantasy X whose protagonist, Tidus, explained the addition of a more specific name would make people be more excited.

Themes expanded in the director's cut Advent Children Complete include Cloud's development with links to other Final Fantasy VII related media where he appeared. In order to further focus on Cloud's growth, Square decided to give him more scenes when he interacts with children. Additionally, the fight between Cloud and Sephiroth was expanded by several minutes, and includes a scene in which Sephiroth impales Cloud on his sword and holds him in the air, mirroring the scene in the game where he performs the same action. The decision to feature Cloud suffering from blood loss in the fight was made in order to make the character's pain feel realistic.

Remake handling

In the making of the fighting game Dissidia: Final Fantasy, Nomura stated that Cloud's appearance was sightly slimmer than in Final Fantasy VII due to the amount of detail that the 3D could the PlayStation Portable game could give him. While also retaining his original design and his Advent Children appearance, Cloud was given a more distinct look based on his Final Fantasy VII persona.

Cloud's initial redesign for Final Fantasy VII Remake departed more dramatically from the original's, but was later altered to more closely resemble Nomura's original design. In an early event from Final Fantasy VII, Cloud crossdresses in order to find Tifa. Nomura noted this event was popular with the fans and reassured the remake would keep this part. On the other hand, the character designer stated that their final design was not decided yet. Kazushige Nojima worked on making Cloud's interactions with Tifa and Barret natural. Despite fear of the possible result, Nojima also wanted the players to connect with the character once again. Kitase further claimed that in the remake they aimed to make Cloud more inexperienced and more informal than in Advent Children, due to him not being fully mature.

Co-director Naoki Hamaguchi noted that since in the original game, the player could decide Cloud's interest in a female character, he wanted the remake to give this possibility again in the form of an intimate conversation when splitting from the main team.
The theme song "Hollow" is meant to reflect Cloud's state of mind with Nomura placing high emphasis on the rock music and male vocals.

Voice actors

There was no voice acting in the original Final Fantasy VII. For the Ehrgeiz fighting game, Kenyu Horiuchi provided Cloud's voice in the arcade version while Nozomu Sasaki replaced him in the home console version. Starting in Kingdom Hearts, Takahiro Sakurai has been the consistent Japanese voice of Cloud. Teruaki Sugawara, the voice director at Square, recommended him to Nomura based on prior experience. Nomura had originally asked Sakurai to play the protagonist of The Bouncer, Sion Barzahd, but found that his voice best suited Cloud after hearing him speak. Sakurai received the script without any accompanying visuals, and first arrived for recording under the impression that he would be voicing a different character other than Cloud. For Advent Children, Nomura wanted to contrast Cloud and Vincent's voices given their similar personalities. As a sequel to the highly popular Final Fantasy VII, Sakurai felt greater pressure performing the role than he did when he voiced Cloud for Kingdom Hearts. Sakurai received comments from colleagues revealing their love of the game, some of them jokingly threatening that they would not forgive Sakurai if he did not meet their expectations.

During recording, Sakurai was told that "[n]o matter what kind of odds are stacked against him, Cloud won't be shaken". Sakurai says that while he recorded most of his work individually, he performed alongside Ayumi Ito, who voiced Tifa, for a few scenes. These recordings left him feeling "deflated", as the "exchanges he has with Tifa can be pretty painful", Sakurai commenting that Cloud—whom he empathized with as his voice actor—has a hard time dealing with straight talk. Sakurai says that there were scenes that took over a year to complete, with very precise directions being given requiring multiple takes.

According to Sakurai, Cloud's silence conveys more about the character than when he speaks. While possessing heroic characteristics, Sakurai describes Cloud's outlook as negative, and says that he is delicate in some respects. A fan of VII, Sakurai had believed Cloud to be a colder character based on his original impression of him, but later came to view him as more sentimental. After the final product was released, Sakurai was anxious to hear the fans' response, whether positive or negative, and says that most of the feedback he received praised him. While recording Crisis Core, Sakurai felt that Cloud, though still introverted, acted more like a normal teenager, and modified his approach accordingly. Cloud's scream over Zack's death left a major impression on Sakurai, who says that he worked hard to convey the emotional tone of the ending. Sakurai has come to regard Cloud as an important role, commenting that Cloud reminds him of his own past, and that, as a Final Fantasy VII fan himself, he is happy to contribute.

For the remake of Final Fantasy VII, Sakurai found Cloud more difficult to portray than his previous performances. He re-recorded his lines multiple times, and credited the voice director with guiding him. Nomura elaborated that the remake's interpretation of Cloud has a distinct personality; he attempts to act cool, but often fails to do so and instead comes across as awkward, which Nomura asked Sakurai to reflect in his acting. Another challenge for the developers was finding a suitable voice for the teenage Cloud seen during flashbacks. In order to better match Cloud's rural upbringing, they decided to hire a child from a rural area rather than an established actor, and ultimately went with 13-year-old Yukihiro Aizawa.

In most English adaptations, Cloud is voiced by Steve Burton. Burton was first hired to voice Cloud after a Square employee saw his role in the 2001 film The Last Castle. Burton's work as Cloud in Advent Children served as his first feature length role, an experience he enjoyed. Calling the character a rare opportunity for him as an actor, Burton describes Cloud as having a "heaviness about him". Burton says he is surprised when fans recognize him for his work as Cloud, whom he has referred to as "[one of the] coolest characters there is", and he too considers himself lucky for having voiced him.

Although Burton expressed his desire to voice Cloud for the remake of Final Fantasy VII, he was replaced by Cody Christian; Burton thanked Square for his work, and wished Christian luck. Christian stated that he was honored to portray what he described as an iconic character, and vowed to give his best performance. He also commented on Burton's previous work, stating, "Steve, you paved the way. You made this character what it is and have contributed in shaping a legacy". Christian used Burton's works as an inspiration for his portrayal of the character. Teenage Cloud was voiced in English by Major Dodson.

Appearances

In Final Fantasy VII
Cloud is introduced as a mercenary employed by AVALANCHE, an eco-terrorist group opposed to the Shinra Company. Beginning the game with the placeholder name , Cloud assists AVALANCHE's leader, Barret Wallace, in bombing a Mako reactor, power plants which drain the planet's "Lifestream". Cloud claims to be formerly of SOLDIER 1st Class, an elite Shinra fighting unit. Despite appearing detached  and more interested to the pay of his work, Cloud demonstrates moments of camaraderie, such as prioritizing Jesse's security than his escape during the Mako Reactor 1's explosion. Players can choose to interact in a friendlier manner with AVALANCHE's members. When approached by his childhood friend and AVALANCHE member, Tifa Lockhart, Cloud agrees to continue helping AVALANCHE. Cloud encounters Aerith Gainsborough, a resident of Midgar's slums. Agreeing to serve as her bodyguard in exchange for a date, Cloud helps Aerith evade Shinra, who pursue her because she is the sole survivor of a race known as the Cetra. During the course of their travels, a love triangle develops between Cloud, Tifa and Aerith.

Following the player's departure from Midgar, Cloud narrates his history with Sephiroth, a legendary member of SOLDIER and the game's primary antagonist, and the events that led to Sephiroth's disappearance five years prior. Joining SOLDIER to emulate Sephiroth, Cloud explains that he would sign up for a "big mission" whenever they became available, as the conclusion of Shinra's war with the people of Wutai ended his chances for military fame. Sephiroth started questioning his humanity after accompanying him on a job to Cloud's hometown of Nibelheim, discovering documents concerning Jenova, an extraterrestrial lifeform and Sephiroth's "mother". This ultimately led to Sephiroth burning down Nibelheim. 
Cloud confronted Sephiroth in the Mt Nibel's Mako Reactor and was believed to have killed him, but Cloud dismisses this as a lie as he knows he would be no match for Sephiroth. He is troubled with the fact that despite most likely losing the fight, he lived after challenging Sephiroth.

However, numerous visual and audio clues suggest the unreliability of Cloud's memory. Cloud will spontaneously remember words or scenes from his past, sometimes collapsing to the ground while cradling his head, and appears not to remember things that he should remember, such as the existence of a SOLDIER First Class named Zack. As Sephiroth starts manipulating his mind, he takes advantage of it by telling him that his past is merely a fiction and that Shinra created Cloud in an attempt to clone Sephiroth. Cloud learns he cannot remember things like how or when he joined SOLDIER. Cloud, resigning himself as a "failed experiment", goes missing. The party later discovers a comatose Cloud suffering from Mako poisoning.

It is revealed that Cloud never qualified for SOLDIER, and instead enlisted as an infantryman in Shinra's army. During the mission to Nibelheim, Cloud served under Sephiroth and Zack, hiding his identity from the townspeople out of embarrassment. Following Sephiroth's defeat of Zack at the Mt. Nibel Mako reactor, Cloud managed to ambush him and throw him into the Lifestream, and believed him dead. Both he and Zack are then imprisoned by Shinra's lead scientist, Hojo, for experimentation. Zack later escapes with Cloud, bringing him to the outskirts of Midgar before Shinra soldiers gun Zack down. Due to exposure to Mako radiation and the injection of Jenova's cells, Cloud's mind creates a false personality largely based on Zack's, inadvertently erasing the latter from his memory. After piecing back together his identity, Cloud resumes his role as leader and the night before the final battle expresses his mutual feelings with Tifa without words. At the game's conclusion, Sephiroth reappears in Cloud's mind a final time, but he is defeated in a one-on-one fight.

In Compilation of Final Fantasy VII

Cloud appears in a minor role in the mobile game Before Crisis: Final Fantasy VII, a prequel set six years before Final Fantasy VII. The player, a member of the Shinra covert operatives group, the Turks, encounters Cloud during his time as a Shinra infantryman working to join SOLDIER. The game portrays Cloud's natural talent for swordsmanship, and recounts his role during Nibelheim's destruction.

In the 2005 computer-animated film Final Fantasy VII: Advent Children, set two years following the conclusion of Final Fantasy VII, Cloud lives with Tifa in the city of Edge, along with Marlene, Barret's adopted daughter, and Denzel, an orphan affected by a rampant and deadly disease called Geostigma. Having given up his life as a mercenary, Cloud works as a courier for the  that Tifa set up in her new bar. Confronted by Tifa following the disappearance of Denzel and Marlene, it is revealed that he also suffers from the effects of Geostigma, and he responds that he is unfit to protect his friends and new family.

However, when urged by Tifa to let go of the past, Cloud sets out for the Forgotten City in search of the children. There, Cloud confronts Kadaj, Loz, and Yazoo, genetic remnants of Sephiroth left behind before he diffused into the Lifestream completely. Cloud's battle with Kadaj later takes them back to Aerith's church, where Cloud recovers from his Geostigma with Aerith's help. Kadaj, merging with the remains of Jenova, resurrects Sephiroth. Cloud, having overcome his doubts, defeats Sephiroth once more, leaving a dying Kadaj in his place. At the film's conclusion, Cloud, seeing Aerith and Zack, assures the two that he will be fine and reunites with his friends.

Cloud appears in On the Way to a Smile, a series of short stories set between Final Fantasy VII and Advent Children. "Case of Tifa" serves as an epilogue to VII, and portrays Cloud's life alongside Tifa, Marlene, and Denzel. "Case of Denzel" relates how Cloud first met Denzel, and was later adapted as a short original video animation for the release of Advent Children Complete, On the Way to a Smile - Episode: Denzel.

Cloud acts in a supporting role in the PlayStation 2 game Dirge of Cerberus: Final Fantasy VII. A year after the events of Advent Children, Cloud, working alongside Barret and Tifa, lends his support to the ground forces of the World Regenesis Organization and his ally Vincent Valentine in their siege of Midgar and counterattack against the rogue Shinra military unit, Deepground.

In the PlayStation Portable game Crisis Core: Final Fantasy VII, Cloud is presented as a young Shinra infantryman who befriends Zack. During the game's conclusion, a dying Zack gives Cloud his Buster Sword, telling him that he is his legacy. The game ends with Cloud heading to Midgar, reprising the start of Final Fantasy VII. Zack and Cloud's connection was also meant to be expanded upon near the game's ending, with both of them planning to flee to Midgar. However, due to limitations in the console's hardware, these scenes could not be implemented, and instead, they decided to focus on Zack.

Cloud reprises his role from the original Final Fantasy VII in the 2020 remake, which is also part of the Compilation of Final Fantasy VII. While marketed as a remake to the original 1997 game, Square claims that there are other different meanings in this game.

In Kingdom Hearts
Nomura redesigned Cloud for his appearance in Kingdom Hearts. He is depicted with a crimson cape and a clawed version of his left-handed glove, while the Buster Sword's blade is wrapped in bandages. Stating that Cloud's left arm was inspired by Vincent Valentine, Nomura explained that he wanted to give the character a more demon-like appearance due to his ties to the dark side in the game. Nomura also stated that he wanted to leave the question of whether Cloud was searching for Aerith open to the player's interpretation. In the first game, Kingdom Hearts, Cloud appears in the Olympus Coliseum world. Hired by Hades to kill Hercules, Cloud must fight Sora as a prerequisite. After the fight, Hades sends Cerberus to attack Cloud and Sora, who is then saved by Hercules. Cloud meets with Sora afterward and explains that he is searching for someone. In Kingdom Hearts: Final Mix there is an additional scene where he battles Sephiroth. During the credit roll at the end of the game, Cloud is shown reuniting residents of Hollow Bastion. A memory-based version of Cloud appears in the Game Boy Advance sequel Kingdom Hearts: Chain of Memories as a boss in the Olympus Coliseum and later as a summon card for Sora.

Cloud reappears in Kingdom Hearts II, this time depicted in his Advent Children design. He is searching for Sephiroth, and is himself being sought out by Tifa. Cloud fights alongside Leon's team during the Heartless invasion of Hollow Bastion. Should the player choose to engage Sephiroth and win the battle, Cloud returns and fights Sephiroth, which ends with both of them disappearing in a flash of light after Tifa gives Cloud her support. Sora concludes that Cloud is still fighting with Sephiroth, and will not stop until he is defeated. A digital replica of Cloud also appears in Kingdom Hearts coded in the Olympus Coliseum, helping Sora and Hercules to battle Hades. Besides the video games, Cloud also appears in the Kingdom Hearts manga adaptations, reprising his original role.

In other media
The OVA Last Order: Final Fantasy VII serves as an alternate retelling of Nibelheim's destruction and Zack and Cloud's escape from Shinra imprisonment. Animated and produced by Madhouse, based on a script by Kazuhiko Inukai, several scenes diverge from Final Fantasy VII depiction of events, such as reinterpreting Cloud's rescue of Tifa by having her view his face. Although it is associated with and makes references to the Compilation of Final Fantasy VII, Last Order is considered an outside work.

Cloud's character has also appeared in various games outside of the Final Fantasy VII continuity. He is a playable character in the PlayStation version of Ehrgeiz. In Chocobo Racing, Cloud is a hidden character that rides a motorcycle. Cloud is one of several playable Final Fantasy VII characters in Itadaki Street Special for the PlayStation 2 and Itadaki Street Portable for the PlayStation Portable. LittleBigPlanet 2 features Cloud as a downloadable character model. Cloud is a playable character representing Final Fantasy VII in the rhythm game Theatrhythm Final Fantasy, with his Advent Children persona serving as downloadable content. Players in Final Fantasy Explorers can briefly transform into Cloud, enabling use of his Omnislash Limit Break from FFVII. Cloud is the protagonist of Final Fantasy VII G-Bike, a mobile game for which Nomura designed a new costume for him. This was inspired by Cloud's Advent Children fights which producer Ichiro Hazama thought was "very cool, and radical", and influences from the title went into the game. CyberConnect2 CEO Hiroshi Matsuyama sought to improve Cloud's popularity with this game.

Cloud appears as a playable guest character in the 2014 Nintendo crossover fighting games Super Smash Bros. for Nintendo 3DS and Wii U, sporting his character designs from both Final Fantasy VII and Advent Children. According to the games' director Masahiro Sakurai, Final Fantasy characters were heavily requested to appear in the Super Smash Bros. series, with Cloud receiving the most support out of all of them. Reflecting on his inclusion in an interview with Tetsuya Nomura, while other characters from the Final Fantasy series were considered Sakurai ultimately felt that none of them could match Cloud's popularity and he could not imagine including a character that wasn't him. His model was primarily based on his appearance in the Dissidia series, with slight alterations under Nomura's supervision. He was made available as in-game downloadable content alongside a stage based on Midgar in December 2015. He returns as a playable character in the 2018 follow up, Super Smash Bros. Ultimate, and is now playable in the game's base roster. A pair of Cloud amiibo figures were released on July 21, 2017. As part of the update adding Sephiroth to the game as downloadable content in December 2020, Cloud was given his "Omnislash Ver. 5" to use against opponents, being exclusive to his Advent Children costumes.

Cloud was a candidate guest character for Soulcalibur II but he was replaced by Heihachi Mishima from Tekken, which similarly to Soulcalibur is a Namco fighting game franchise that even shares Yoshimitsu as a regular character for both series.

In the PlayStation game Final Fantasy Tactics and its PlayStation Portable update, The War of the Lions, Cloud is accidentally pulled into the world of Ivalice by an ancient machine called "the Celestial Globe", which was activated by Ramza Beoulve. Cloud is disoriented after arriving in Ramza's world, and after a short exchange with Ramza and the others, he leaves. He wanders into Zarghidas Trade City, where he encounters a flower girl named Aerith. As Cloud is leaving the area, Aerith is accosted by a man demanding payment. Cloud returns to help Aerith escape, and Ramza and his party catch up to him. After the battle, he joins Ramza's party as a playable character. Cloud also appears as an enemy unit in the "Brave Story" series of battles as part of Rendezvous, the unlockable cooperative multiplayer mode in The War of the Lions.

Cloud serves as the representative hero of Final Fantasy VII in Dissidia Final Fantasy, a fighting game featuring characters from the Final Fantasy series. He is depicted in his FFVII design, while his Advent Children design is also available. His fight against Sephiroth in this game is based on their battles from VII and Advent Children. Along with the entire cast, Cloud reappears in the prequel Dissidia 012 as a Warrior of Chaos. Concerned for Tifa, who is on the opposing side, Cloud tries to defeat Chaos alone; after nearly being killed, he is saved by the goddess Cosmos, and becomes one of her warriors. Cloud's main outfit is based on Yoshitaka Amano's original artwork concept, while his Kingdom Hearts outfit is offered as downloadable content. Cloud again appears as a playable character opposite Sephiroth in the series' third entry, Dissidia NT, wearing his Advent Children outfit. The development staff worked carefully to translate Cloud's original moves from his previous role, most notably his swordplay Omnislash which was developed to be his strongest move.

Although Cloud does not appear in Lightning Returns: Final Fantasy XIII, his Final Fantasy VII attire appears as an alternative for the main character alongside the Buster Sword. The Advent Children outfit is also present in Final Fantasy XIV: A Realm Reborn. Cloud's original attire is also present in the mobile phone game Mobius Final Fantasy, and Final Fantasy Explorers-Force. Cloud's buster sword appears in Astro's Playroom.

Cultural impact

Critical reception

Cloud has been mostly well received by critics. In his review of the PC release of Final Fantasy VII, Ron Dulin of GameSpot commented that "a simple understatement will have to suffice: Cloud is easily the most interesting and complex character ever presented in a game". RPGamers Aujang Abadi called Cloud "one of the most complex characters Square has created", as well as "the first truly complicated main character". Chi Kong Lui, writing for GameCritics, opined that while Final Fantasy VII features "some of the most complex characters ever created, by video game standards", their personalities are "paper-thin". He criticized Cloud's "childish motivations", stating that Final Fantasy VII could not "match the depth of screenplay in Orson Welles' Citizen Kane or the complexities of characters exhibited in Martin Scorsese's Taxi Driver". GamesRadar liked the cross-dressing scene in the game. Cloud and Aerith's tragic relationship was also popular with writers. 

Cloud's redesign in Kingdom Hearts was praised of the best in the game by PSXetreme and Animefringe. His development in Advent Children was praised by DVD Talk as one of the best parts from the film. Cloud's guilt over Aerith's death was effective enough to move viewers. Newtype USA also praised Cloud's role in Advent Children due to his heroic traits despite being a reluctant hero. Joystiqs Andrew Yoon opined that the director's cut version of the film provides more depth to Cloud's development, taking advantage of its longer runtime by better "humanizing [him]". GamesRadar stated that while Cloud felt like a "miserable" character in the film, his coming to terms with his past was appealing alongside his new swords stored in his bike. Yoshinori Kitase said that the fight between Cloud and Sephiroth was popular enough to make Japanese gamers do a remake of it for the crossover Dissidia Final Fantasy and expected Western fans also emulate it. Steve Burton's performance in Advent Children was also praised to the point of being one of the best English actors. In the Guinness World Records Gamer's Edition of 2011, Cloud was voted as the fifth best video game character. In a poll, Cloud was voted as one of the best characters voiced by Takahiro Sakurai. Meristation praised Cloud's new appearance in Advent Children and how it came across appealing in the spin-off Dirge of Cerberus even if he was no longer the main character and thus had less screentime. HobbyConsolas also included Cloud on their "The 30 best heroes of the last 30 years".

When deciding on using a Final Fantasy representative for Nintendo's crossover fighting games Super Smash Bros. for Nintendo 3DS and Wii U, Nomura and Super Smash Bros. series creator and director Masahiro Sakurai quickly agreed with adding Cloud to the cast. This was mostly because of Cloud's high popularity within the series in contrast to other Final Fantasy characters like Bartz or Terra, and multiple requests from fans of the character by extension. According to Sakurai, he envisioned Cloud as being a relatively easy to play character in anticipation of a large variety of players using him, and stated that the Buster Sword served as a lynchpin in regard to developing his sword swings. Cloud's popularity and addition to the Super Smash Bros. series generated multiple response, most notably in Twitter's trends. Although The Verge pointed out that such a crossover game also featured similar characters like Solid Snake, as well as title characters Mega Man and Sonic the Hedgehog, they nevertheless expressed surprise over Cloud's inclusion because of Final Fantasy VIIs lack of release on a Nintendo console. Despite of that, he was well received.

During anticipation for the remake of Final Fantasy VII, Cloud's role in the trailers were the focus of multiple journalists. IGN highly praised the design and marketing involving his visual appearance. TechSpot noted fans were interested in Cloud's love interests but claimed that Cloud's relationship with Aerith was subtle in retrospective. Comic Book Resources also looked forward to this love triangle. Despite noting his antisocial attitudes in the remake, IGN, Metro and GameSpot commented Cloud is the character who has through the most notable arc in the entire remake with Christian's performance helping to improve his appeal. In a feature article, GameSpot compared Cloud with Kazuma Kiryu from Sega's Yakuza video game series due to both sharing similar features and development across the narrative through Midgar.

Analysis

Cloud's characterizaton was the subject of analysis. Unicorn Lynx of Sharon Packer identifies Cloud as having mental illness in the form of dissociative identity disorder (DID), while Katie Whitlock identifies him as having involuntary memory resulting from post-traumatic stress disorder (PTSD). The book Japanese Culture Through Videogames addresses Cloud as a complex fictional character, comparing him with Metal Gears Solid Snake, Final Fantasy VIs Terra Branford and Tekkens Jin Kazama due to his identity issues. Kurt Kalata of Gamasutra stated that Cloud is "somewhat of a weakling" with grandiose delusions and other psychological issues. He also called Cloud one of the first unreliable narrators in a role-playing video game. According to Patrick Holleman, "no RPG has ever deliberately betrayed the connection between protagonist and player like FFVII does". The game's use of the unreliable narrator literary concept has drawn comparisons to films such as Fight Club (1999), The Sixth Sense (1999), American Psycho (2000), and Memento (2000), with Patrick Holleman and Jeremy Parish arguing that the game takes the unreliable narrator concept a step further, by its interactivity establishing a connection between the player and the protagonist. Jack Ridsdale of PCGamesN argues that Cloud is a deconstruction of the hero archetype and toxic masculinity, and compares the plot twist about his true identity to that of Fight Club. Cloud and Terra were also compared with Zidane Tribal from Final Fantasy IX as they all shared existential crisis upon realizing that they are not who they actually think they are, something which was noted to be common Japanese role-playing game from 1990s by the time Zidane debuted, making him repetitive instead.

PCGamer also approved Cloud's portrayal in the remake for often showing his vulnerable side despite starting the game as a stoic skiled man, something uncommon in video game. Besides his bond with Tifa, the writer approved of other relationships the character forms, making him more relatable. Though Cloud often clashes with Sephiroth and does not form a remarkable bond with Zack Fair, PCGamer commented that their scenes has led too to the rise of new LGBT support focused on them.

In regards to Advent Children, Destructoid noted there was a message within the writing of the film regarding the characters' lives in Midgar, leading them to move on with their lives in a similar fashion to Final Fantasy VII gamers since the story ended with Cloud saving Midgar from Sephiroth's resurrection which would threaten it again especially when the spirit of Zack Fair reminds him that he has already defeated him already. Kotaku saw the focus on the Midgar's ruins as a parallelism with psychological trauma due to how all of its survivors suffer a disease that cannot be fought with Cloud's striking weaponry on its own. In the book The World of Final Fantasy VII: Essays on the Game and Its Legacy, Cloud is also seen as a Messiah with Tifa and Aerith being one of his main supporters to help progress and defeat Sephiroth, though the end of the narrative has Cloud appreciating the victory thanks to his "pillars". While Cloud is never addressed as a God, he instead has to protect God's peace as Sephiroth instead plays the role of Satan as well as his own Shadow with Cloud having to surpass him in the narrative.

Popularity and other influences in the media
Cloud set a trend in the Final Fantasy series in regards to the characterization of main characters. Following Final Fantasy VII, Nomura designed Squall Leonhart, the lead of Final Fantasy VIII giving him a similar anti-hero persona. Tasked with creating a "female version of Cloud" for Final Fantasy XIII, Nomura designed Lightning with Cloud's success in mind, stating that he "desired for her to be ... loved for a long time, like Cloud". After Lightning was voted as the most popular female character in the series by Japanese fans, Mollie Patterson of EGMNOW commented: "Some have also brought up that Lightning is kind of the female equivalent to Cloud, which might be why she gets so much love". However, for Final Fantasy X, the staff aimed for a more contrasting hero would act more cheerful in the narrative, Tidus. Similarly, Nomura created Noctis Lucis Caelum from Final Fantasy XV with another different characterization from Cloud and Squall's and instead more insecure.

IGN stated that Cloud set a trend for role-playing video game heroes, describing his "spiky blond hair" and "gigantic Buster Sword" as "instantly identifiable icons, recognized by gamers around the world". Edge described Cloud as an example of "excellent design and characterization". Famitsu in 2010 published a seven-page tribute to Cloud, showcasing his many appearances throughout the years. In 2014, IGN held a poll for fans to vote for the most favorite Final Fantasy character of all time, as well as individually in each title. Over 2 million votes were cast in. Cloud ranked number one of all the characters. He also took the same place in the Final Fantasy VII title alone as well. In 2013, Complex ranked Cloud as the eighth greatest soldier in video games. In 2005, Electronic Gaming Monthly placed Cloud seventh in their list of top video game characters. He was named best character of all time in Dengeki PlayStations 2007 "Den-Play Awards". IGN in 2008 ranked him third in both their lists of top Final Fantasy VII and Final Fantasy series characters. GameSpot published a video titled "Greatest Game Hero: Cloud Strife" for his inclusion in their 2009 "All Time Greatest Game Hero" poll, showcasing scenes of Cloud as he appears in Advent Children. UGO Networks placed him first in their 2010 list of top Japanese RPG characters, stating "Cloud is the cloth from whom the great majority of JRPG characters were cut". That same year, GamesRadar listed Cloud as the second best Final Fantasy hero of all the time, describing him as "one of the most well-rounded and thought-out characters in the series". He was also ranked as the second best Final Fantasy character in a 2010 list by VideoGamer.com, who called him a "poster boy for the entire JRPG genre". In 2011, Empire ranked Cloud as the 13th greatest video game character: "He is, and always will be, the definitive FF poster child – an enduring axiom of character design". GameZone ranked Cloud second in their 2012 list of top Final Fantasy characters, attributing the success of Final Fantasy VII largely to his character. In 2013, Complex named him the greatest Final Fantasy character of all time, citing his "killer backstory, iconic weaponry, and a great game to the boot". In 2021, Rachel Weber of GamesRadar ranked Cloud as 18th of their "50 iconic video game characters".

In an Oricon poll conducted in 2008, Cloud placed second overall for most popular video game character, ranking second among men and third with women. In a 2010 ASCII Media Works poll asking fans which video game or manga character they would like to name their children after, Cloud's name ranked third for male characters. That same year, Famitsu readers voted Cloud as the third best video game character of all time.

In promoting the Final Fantasy VII remake, artwork of Cloud was used in buildings from Los Angeles.

Merchandise
Cloud has been merchandised extensively, in many different forms, including figurines and jewelry. In commemoration of the franchise's 20th anniversary, Square released figurines of him alongside other Final Fantasy protagonists. Square Enix's manager of merchandise, Kanji Tashiro, said at the 2008 San Diego Comic-Con International that Cloud's likeness has produced some of the company's best-selling items, and that fans could look forward to further adaptations of the character in the future. Popular models at the time included Cloud's Advent Children figurine and Final Fantasy VII Hardy-Daytona bike set, both of which sold particularly well in European and North American markets. Square has also released two promotional books primarily focusing on Cloud's character: Cloud vol.1, which was released in 2007, and Cloud message, in 2008. In 2013, a replica of the Buster Sword was created by blacksmith Tony Swatton for the webseries Man at Arms.

See also
 List of Final Fantasy VII characters

References

Further reading

External links

 Cloud Strife on the Final Fantasy Wiki

Characters designed by Tetsuya Nomura
Fictional bodyguards in video games
Fictional characters with amnesia
Fictional characters with post-traumatic stress disorder
Fictional criminals in video games
Fictional child soldiers
Fictional cross-dressers
Fictional eco-terrorists
Fictional mercenaries in video games
Fictional private military members
Fictional soldiers in video games
Fictional super soldiers
Fictional swordfighters in video games
Final Fantasy VII characters
Genetically engineered characters in video games
Male characters in video games
Orphan characters in video games
Science fantasy video game characters
Square Enix protagonists
Super Smash Bros. fighters
Video game characters introduced in 1997
Video game characters who can move at superhuman speeds
Video game characters with superhuman strength
Video game mascots
Video game bosses